The Netherlands competed at the 2012 Winter Youth Olympics in Innsbruck, Austria.

Medalists

Alpine skiing

Netherlands qualified 2 athletes.

While formally listed on the team Valentijn van der Avoort was not listed to compete in any events.

Girls

Bobsleigh

Netherlands qualified 4 athletes.

Girls

Ice hockey

Netherlands qualified 2 athletes.

Boys

Girls

Short track

Netherlands qualified 2 athletes.

Boys

Girls

Mixed

Skeleton

Netherlands qualified 1 athlete.

Girls

Ski jumping

Netherlands qualified 1 athlete.

Boys

Snowboarding

Netherlands qualified 2 athletes.

Boys

Speed skating

Netherlands qualified 4 athletes.

Boys

Girls

See also
Netherlands at the 2012 Summer Olympics

References

2012 in Dutch sport
Nations at the 2012 Winter Youth Olympics
Netherlands at the Youth Olympics